William J. "Bo" Hanley (July 10, 1891 – November 23, 1954) was an American football player and coach.  He served a head coach for the Kenosha Maroons of the National Football League (NFL) for one season in 1924.  Hanley played college football at Marquette University, where he was nicknamed the "Marquette Marvel".

In 1911, Hanley played baseball for one season for the Aurora Blues of the Wisconsin-Illinois League.

In 1920, Hanley's younger brother, Cornelius "Pat" Hanley played for the Detroit Heralds. Pat also played college football at Marquette.

Biography
Hanley was born on July 10, 1891.  He died in Milwaukee, Wisconsin on November 23, 1954.

Coaching
Hanley served as the head football coach at the Colorado School of Mines in Golden, Colorado from 1914 to 1915.

Head coaching record

College

References

1890s births
1954 deaths
Kenosha Maroons coaches
Marquette Golden Avalanche football players
Aurora Blues players
Colorado Mines Orediggers football coaches
Sportspeople from Milwaukee
Players of American football from Milwaukee